Konrad Januszowic (ca. 1400 - 9 December 1412 or 1413), was a Polish prince member of the House of Piast.

He was the youngest son of Duke Janusz I of Warsaw and Danutė of Lithuania, a daughter of Kęstutis.

Life
He is only mentioned in the Tomicki Genealogy; there is listed among the descendants of the Dukes of Masovia, indicating that he died childless. Konrad's name was found frequently in the Masovian branch of the Piast dynasty. He died at a young age, probably long before the death of his father. His burial place is unknown.

Notes

References
J. Grabowski: Dynastia Piastów mazowieckich, Avalon Editorial, Kraków 2012, pp. 461–462.
K. Jasiński: Rodowód Piastów mazowieckich, Poznań – Wrocław 1998, p. 104.
O. Balzer: Genealogia Piastów, vol. II, Avalon Editorial, Kraków 2005, p. 845.

Dukes of Masovia
Year of birth uncertain
Year of death uncertain
1400 births
1413 deaths